Chating is a town in  Wangcheng district of Changsha, Hunan, China. the town is located on the northeast of the district, and bordered by Zhangshu and Jinlong towns of Xiangyin county to the north, Gaojiafang town of Miluo city to the east, Qiaoyi town to the south, Dingziwan and Tongguan Subdistricts to the west.

Subdivision
The Chating town was formed by merging the former Dongcheng town and Chating on November 19, 2015. Chating has 11 villages and two residential communities under its jurisdiction from 2016. there were 15 villages and two residential communities in the subdistrict at that time till 2015. There three new villages were formed by merging six villages, meanwhile Dongcheng residential community was formed by merging Shenjiaqiao residential community and Jingshen village on March 23, 2016.

References

External links 

Township-level divisions of Wangcheng
Wangcheng